James River Church (formerly, James River Assembly) is a Pentecostal multi-site megachurch based in Ozark, Missouri. It is affiliated with Assemblies of God USA. In 2019, James River reported an average weekly attendance of 19,000, making it one of the ten largest AG churches and one of the largest churches in Missouri (subsequently Springfield). John Lindell is the Lead Pastor alongside wife Debbie.

History
James River Church was founded out of the desire of the four couples, Rodger and Caressa Gadd, Gary and Debbie Simms, Tim and Carol Carpenter, and David and Gwenda Plummer, to start a church on the southeast side of Springfield, even though Assemblies of God leaders said there were plenty of area AG churches. Under the leadership of retired Assemblies of God minister, Kenneth D. Barney of Springfield, the small congregation grew quickly and had to move into a larger space in an office park within nine months. It was at that time that John Lindell was hired to serve as pastor of the congregation. When he arrived in September 1991, he asked about expectations and the answer was "400 people in four years". However, in 1993, the average attendance topped 800.

In August 1992, the church built its first home off of US Highway 65 and Evans road. 415 attended the dedication ceremony.

During 1993–1995, a new addition was built onto the church as membership grew from 868 to 2,292. During a time of overflow, John Lindell asked the church to fast and pray for a new location in February 1996. There was land owned off 65 and CC by a farming family since the Civil War and had turned down offers from major retailers to sell the land. Following the fast and prayer, the family agreed to sell the land to James River and James River moved into the South campus in March 2000 with 4,000 in weekly attendance with 198,000 square foot facility. The south campus in Ozark is the main campus of James River Church. The sanctuary holds 3,400 seats. In June 2003, a West Wing and gymnasium was added to the South Campus. It includes multiple sanctuaries, a cafe, meeting rooms, offices, children and youth facilities, One Heart ministry, and the River Fitness Center. In June 2007, James River Church launched their Changing History Campaign. Through this campaign, JRC-South added a  two-story addition to the children's wing and remodeled portions of the children's wing and the Realife Student Center. The estimated cost of construction was over eight million dollars.

The church continued to grow by thousands from 2006-2009. The church grew to over 8000 members by 2008. In order to meet the growth, the church announced plans for its second campus and being a multisite church. The second campus, James River Church - West Campus, was launched in September 2009. It is located off of US Hwy 60 and FF in Southwest Springfield. A ground-breaking ceremony was held at JRC-West in fall 2010 for further expansion at that location. Construction began in the summer of 2011 and was completed in spring 2013. The new first service was held at the West Campus in December 2012 in the 1500 seat sanctuary.

In November 2013, the church officially changed its name from James River Assembly to James River Church.  In a preface to his Sunday sermon, Pastor John Lindell cited a need of clarity and cohesion as the primary reason for the name change.  He mentioned that outreach in foreign cities and countries was sometimes difficult as the term 'assembly' was not as widely known or understood.  The pastor also made clear that the change in no way affected the church's relationship with the Assemblies of God.

Continuing to grow, the church added on to a third location, the North campus, off I-44 and West Bypass in Springfield. The average weekly attendance is 1,300. The first service was held on September 11, 2016 with 2500 in attendance.

During the 2016 Vision Sunday, along with plans to be one church in three locations, James River Church also announced plans for a weekly global broadcast on GOD TV. The church announced plans also to open a free preschool in Downtown Springfield for low-income families, then in August 2016, the free preschool was launched. Additionally, the church had bought secured 55 acres of land between I-44 and 65N in Springfield, and this land will later be used for the James River East Campus.

In the 2018 Vision Sunday, there were plans announced for a James River Joplin Campus inside the Victory Mission Center to open later in the year. The Joplin Campus is the fourth campus and the first campus outside of Springfield and Ozark. Its grand opening is set for September 9, 2018.

On April 8, 2019, local news reported that in order to have a permanent home for its Joplin campus, the James River Church bought a building that was being leased by the Price Cutter grocery store- the only locally owned grocery store in the city, as its owners were looking to sell the store.

James River Church - West Campus 
In September 2009, James River Church launched a second campus in addition to JRC-South with the slogan, "One Church in Two Locations." At first called Wilson's Creek campus, the name was changed to James River Church - West Campus (JRC-West) in spring 2012. The JRC-West Campus features many of the same on-campus services as JRC-South. John Lindell remains the senior pastor at the JRC-South Campus. Curt Cook was the JRC-West Campus pastor until the spring 2011. David Lindell, John Lindell's son, is the current pastor at JRC-West Campus.

An estimated 2,200 attended the grand opening in September 2009, and as of March 2010, the average Sunday morning attendance at James River West averaged nearly 2,000.

In December 2012 there was a grand opening of their new facilities. This included a 1,400-seat auditorium, kids venues, and a full youth center.  These additions are funded through a campaign known as "The One Campaign", which used the slogan "One church in Two Locations." The name of this site was changed to the West campus as it is west of the HWY 65 and HWY 160 interchange as decided by the leaders.

Community and international outreach
James River Church hosts a variety of events at their four campuses, including Stronger Mens Conference and Designed For Life women's conferences, holiday events for families and children, and sport teams. James River Church organizes community service events such as an annual service project to paint, clean, and landscape public schools in the area. The church also helps to promote foster parenting and adoption with Cherish Kids.

From 1997 to 2010, one of JRC's local events was the annual Fourth of July patriotic program, the I Love America! Celebration. In 2009, attendance for the 13th annual event, which was free to the public, reached approximately 120,000 people. Attendance in 2010 fell to 100,000.

Internationally, the church has partnered with Mission of Mercy in the sponsorship of several hundred children in Haiti. Additionally, the church has sponsored the digging of water wells in underdeveloped countries.

James River Church also support planting churches. In 2013, JRC announced and planted 100 house churches in Russia. In 2015, JRC announced and planted 100 house churches in Cuba, and in 2016 JRC announced it would plant 40 churches in varied locations worldwide. In 2017 another 40 churches were planted and in 2018 another 41 churches planted worldwide. Due to extra growth and funding, the amount of church plants increased from the first church plant in 2013, to 843 churches planted by 2019.

James River Church is very active in Missions. In 2017, $4,447,383 was given to missions. In 2017, 513 missionaries were supported.

James River College
In 2007, James River Church introduced JRCollege, in partnership with Central Bible College in Springfield, Missouri. JRCollege is a college that is focused on developing leaders for church ministry to the workplace. JRCollege offers a two-year fully accredited leadership degree program in which students learn about the Bible and leadership in ministry both in the classroom and through hands-on experience. All JRCollege classes take place on the James River Church-South Campus and are taught by professors from Evangel University.

In fall 2009 the James River Leadership College merged with the James River Masters Commission program, bringing both programs together as James River Leadership College.

In fall 2011 the James River Leadership College switched partnership from Central Bible College to Evangel University in Springfield, Missouri. James River Leadership College changed its official name to James River Leadership Campus.

In fall 2013 Dr. Jon Spence, who was the founding president,  stepped down as the director of the Campus. Rev Josh Hackworth, a pastor from James River Church, was elected as the director of JRCollege. JRCollege is averaging around 130 students each year.

In 2017, James River Leadership College changed its name to James River College.

James River Charities
James River Church established James River Charities in 2008.  James River Charities in a wholly owned single member entity of James River Church, and operates or manages several different areas, including James River Retreat Center, The River Fitness Center, James River Youth, Cherish Kids and James River College.

Controversies

Haunted: Pursuing the Paranormal 
On October 28, 2018, John Lindell stated during a sermon that yoga is a "form of Eastern mysticism that Christians should absolutely avoid".

Christmas 2020 Gathering 
Between December 5–6, 2020, James River Church hosted several large indoor gatherings to celebrate Christmas. Due to the recent surge of Covid-19 infections, the Christian County Health Department issued a notice that attendees should monitor their symptoms for 14 days after the event, and to contact a medical professional if any symptoms arise.

References

External links
Main Website
James River Church

JRC Websites
James River Leadership Campus
James River Youth
Life Groups
Designed For Life
Cherish Kids

Assemblies of God churches
Evangelical megachurches in the United States
Pentecostal churches in Missouri
Christian organizations established in 1991
Buildings and structures in Christian County, Missouri
1991 establishments in Missouri
Pentecostal multisite churches